Chris Mew (born 7 May 1961) is a former Australian rules footballer who played for Hawthorn in the Victorian/Australian Football League.

A defender, Mew usually played at centre half-back and was a five-time premiership player, in 1983, 1986, 1988, 1989 and 1991.

He retired after the 1989 season but was talked into returning by weekly visits from his coach Allan Jeans.

At the start of 1993, without playing a game, he ruptured his Achilles tendon and retired immediately.

Mew was named as a centre half-back in Hawthorn's official 'Team of the Century'.

External links
Chris Mew's profile at AustralianFootball.com

1961 births
Living people
Australian rules footballers from Victoria (Australia)
Hawthorn Football Club players
Hawthorn Football Club Premiership players
Victorian State of Origin players
Five-time VFL/AFL Premiership players